The 1858 San Diego hurricane was a very rare hurricane that impacted Southern California. It is the only known tropical cyclone to directly impact California as a hurricane, although other systems have impacted California as tropical storms. The storm caused considerable damage to many homes and other structures in southern California, mainly around San Diego. A later estimate indicated that if a similar storm happened in 2004, it would have caused $500 million (2004 USD) in damage.

Meteorological history
In late September 1858, a hurricane formed over the eastern Pacific Ocean, concurrent with a moderate El Niño event spanning 1857–58. Unlike most east Pacific storms, this one accelerated toward the north-northeast. On October 2, it neared Southern California while weakening, due to cool sea surface temperatures and strong wind shear. The hurricane just missed making landfall, while turning to the west-northwest. The storm approached Santa Catalina Island in the Channel Islands and dissipated later on that day. There is some uncertainty to this reconstructed path.

Impact
In San Diego, heavy rain fell, and property damage was significant; many homes lost their roofs, and a few even collapsed. In addition, trees were uprooted, and fences destroyed. A recently constructed windmill was also blown away completely. Three schooners, the Plutus, the Lovely Flora, and the X.L., were blown ashore, although only the X.L. suffered major damage.

Rainfall in San Pedro was also heavy, but high winds were not reported. Parts of the embankment in the city were washed away, causing only around US$100 ($3,100.02 in 2019) in damage. The yacht Medora was washed ashore. Many reports claimed that the yacht was irreparable, but it was later claimed that the damage was not serious and could be repaired. A barge was destroyed, as was a large portion of the San Pedro wharf.

El Monte was buffeted by high winds, damaging corn crops and trees.

Two researchers with NOAA, Michael Chenoweth and Christopher Landsea reconstructed the path of the hurricane using accounts from newspapers of the strong winds. They estimated that if a similar storm were to have hit in 2004, it would have caused around US$500 million in damage.

Records 
The hurricane was the only hurricane in recorded history known to impact California. Due to the cold water California Current tropical cyclones typically weaken, diminishing the storms' strength below the tropical storm level.

See also

 List of Pacific hurricanes
 List of California hurricanes
 1939 California tropical storm

References

Category 1 Pacific hurricanes
Hurricanes in California
San Diego hurricane
San Diego hurricane
San Diego hurricane
San Diego hurricane
19th century in San Diego
History of San Diego County, California
San Diego hurricane
September 1858 events
October 1858 events